The 2020 Clare Senior Hurling Championship was the 125th staging of the Clare Senior Hurling Championship since its establishment by the Clare County Board in 1887. The championship was postponed indefinitely due to the coronavirus pandemic in Ireland. The draw for the opening round fixtures eventually took place on 1 July 2020. The championship began on 24 July 2020 and concluded on 27th September 2020.

Sixmilebridge retained their 2019 title by defeating near-neighbours O'Callaghan Mills in the 2020 final who were contesting their first final since 1993 which they ironically also lost to Sixmilebridge.

Format Change
Time constraints led to a revision of the championship format, most notably the abolition of Round 3. The championship saw eight first-round games with the winners of these ties being drawn against the losers for the second round. The eight winners of the Round 2 games advance to the quarter-finals with open draws applying to all rounds. The eight losing teams from Round 2 entered the Clare Senior B Championship. There will be no relegation.

Senior Championship Fixtures

First round
 Eight winners advance to Round 2 as top seeds
 Eight losers advance to Round 2 as second seeds

Second round
 Eight winners from Round 1 are seeded
 Eight losers from Round 2 are unseeded
 Eight winners advance to Quarter-Finals
 Eight losers move to Senior B Championship

The original fixture between Cratloe and Éire Óg was postponed due to an outbreak of Covid-19 within both the Cratloe and Clondegad communities. After an emergency meeting of the Clare County Board it was agreed to postpone any game that the Cratloe Senior and Junior, and Clondegad Junior teams were due to play by a period of two weeks. All subsequent games involving these clubs or their conquerors would also be delayed down the line due to this decision. This would allow sufficient time for those affected to recover before returning to play.

Quarter-finals
 Played by eight winners of Round 2

Semi-finals

2020 County Final

Other Fixtures

Senior B Championship 
 Played by eight losers of Round 2

References

Clare Senior Hurling Championship
Clare
Clare Senior Hurling Championship